Jandre Coetzee (born 15 January 1984 in Springbok, South Africa) is a South African first class cricketer for Griqualand West. A left-arm medium bowler, he made his first class debut in 2004–05 and in his 3 seasons has taken 92 wickets at 24.51 with best innings bowling figures of 7/42. He was included in the Griqualand West cricket team for the 2015 Africa T20 Cup.

References

External links
 

1984 births
Living people
Afrikaner people
South African people of Dutch descent
Griqualand West cricketers
South African cricketers